Lutu Tenari S. Fuimaono (September 15, 1930 – September 19, 2004) American Samoa politician and journalist who was the longest-serving legislator in the territory's history. He served as the President of the American Samoa Senate from 1996 until his death in 2004. Before being elected president, he served three terms in the American Samoa House of Representatives prior to becoming a senator.

Early life and education
Fuimaono was born and raised in Fagatogo, where he attended Poyer School and the High School of American Samoa. Upon graduating high school, Fuimaono moved to California, where he enrolled at Reedley College in Reedley, California, and later Automation Institution of California. He later served in the United States Air Force from 1954 to 1958.

Career 
In the mid-1960s, Fuimaono moved with his family back to American Samoa, where he attended American Samoa Community College while also being employed as a newscaster for television KVZK as well as radio station WVUV. He became the radio station’s manager in 1966. He also worked briefly as a meat inspector with the Food Safety and Inspection Service.

Fuimaono was later elected to the American Samoa House of Representatives where he served for three terms as the chief clerk. He was first elected to the American Samoa Senate in the 15th Legislature. He served as a senator for 19 years prior to being elected Senate President in 1996. During his first election for Senate President, he unsuccessfully ran against incumbent Letuli Toloa in January 1995. Upon Letuli’s death, Fuimaono was elected Senate President. Fuimaono won his first full term in January 1997 and served until his death in September 2004.

Personal life 
He married his wife Sinira Talatonu in California. They had eight children.

References

Further reading
 Sunia, Fofō I. F. (1998). The Story of the Legislature of American Samoa: In Commemoration of the Golden Jubilee 1948-1998. Pago Pago, AS: Legislature of American Samoa. Page 264. .

1930 births
2004 deaths
People from Pago Pago
Reedley College alumni
American Samoan politicians
American Samoa Senators
20th-century American politicians
American people of Samoan descent
Members of the American Samoa House of Representatives